The 1946 Maryland gubernatorial election was held on November 5, 1946. Democratic nominee William Preston Lane Jr. defeated Republican nominee Theodore McKeldin with 54.73% of the vote.

, this marks the last occasion in which a nominee from Western Maryland won a gubernatorial election.

General election

Candidates
William Preston Lane Jr., Democratic
Theodore McKeldin, Republican

Results

References

1946
Maryland
Gubernatorial